Freda is a surname. Notable people with the surname include:

Anthony Freda, American illustrator
Elena Freda (1890–1978), Italian mathematician
Fabrizio Freda (born 1957), Italian businessman
Franco Freda (born 1941), Italian right-wing intellectual
Frank Freda, American playwright, actor and businessman
Taison Barcellos Freda (born 1988), Brazilian footballer
Riccardo Freda (1909–1999), Italian film director
William C. Freda, American financier

Italian-language surnames